The 1912–13 season was Manchester United's 21st season in the Football League and sixth in the First Division.

First Division

FA Cup

References

Manchester United F.C. seasons
Manchester United